Alain Côté may refer to:

 Alain Côté (ice hockey, born 1957), left winger
 Alain Côté (ice hockey, born 1967), defence
 Alain Côté (fencer) (born 1963), Canadian Olympic fencer